Prefumo Creek is a tributary stream of San Luis Obispo Creek.

References

Rivers of San Luis Obispo County, California
San Luis Obispo, California
Rivers of Southern California